The 1993-94 season was FC Kremin Kremenchuk's 3rd consecutive season in the Ukrainian Premier League.

Events
 October 1993 - after 8 games head coach Borys Streltsov is replaced with Tiberiy Korponay.
 November 1993 at the end of first half of the season head coach Tiberiy Korponay leaves the team.
 March 1994 - July 1994 - Evhen Rudakov is the head coach for the team.

Players

Squad information

Ukrainian Premier League

League table

References

External links
 FC Kremin Kremenchuk official website

FC Kremin Kremenchuk seasons
Kremin Kremenchuk